Hospice, released on May 8, 2007 through Hex Records, is the second full-length studio album and fifth release from the Rochester-based hardcore band Achilles. It is the follow-up to the somewhat unknown split album Achilles/Seven Bowls of Wrath and received mostly favourable reviews.

Track listing

Personnel

Achilles
 Rory van Grol - vocals
 Rob Antonucci - guitar, layout design
 Josh Dillon - bass
 Chris Browne - drums

Studio personnel
 Vince Ratti - production, engineering
 Alan Douches - mastering

Additional personnel
 Shawn Carney - photography

Release history

Details
 Recording studio: The Skylight Studio in Fairless Hills, Pennsylvania
 Mastering studio: West West Side Music in New Windsor, New York
 Distributor: Lumberjack Mordam Music Group
 Recording type: studio
 Recording mode: stereo
 SPARS code: n/a

References

External links
 Achilles MySpace
 Achilles Facebook
 Achilles PureVolume
 Achilles Last.fm

2005 albums
Achilles (band) albums